Gilbert Charles Maurice Lèpre (6 February 1945 - 1 September 1974) is a French ice hockey player. He competed in the men's tournament at the 1968 Winter Olympics.

References

External links
 

1945 births
1974 deaths
Ice hockey players at the 1968 Winter Olympics
Olympic ice hockey players of France
Sportspeople from Creuse